Dabilje is a village in the municipality of Strumica, North Macedonia.

Demographics
According to the 2002 census, the village had a total of 1,946 inhabitants. Ethnic groups in the village include:

Macedonians 1,940
Serbs 5
Others 1

References

Villages in Strumica Municipality